Jessica Ruth Mueller (born February 20, 1983) is an American actress and singer. She started her acting career in Chicago and won two Joseph Jefferson Awards in 2008 and 2011 for her roles as Carrie Pipperidge in Carousel and Amalia Balash in She Loves Me. In 2011, she moved to New York City to star in a Broadway revival of musical On a Clear Day You Can See Forever, for which she was nominated for a Tony Award for Best Featured Actress in a Musical. She won the 2014 Tony Award for Best Actress in a Leading Role in a Musical for her performance as Carole King in Beautiful: The Carole King Musical. She went on to receive two additional Best Actress in a Musical Tony Award nominations for her leading roles in Waitress (2016) and the Broadway revival of Carousel (2018).

Early life and education
Mueller was born to actors Jill (née Shellabarger) and Roger Mueller and was raised in Evanston, Illinois.

Her brothers, Andrew and Matt, and sister, Abby, are all actors and known for their work in Chicago, off-Broadway, and Broadway productions. As of 2019, three of the four Mueller siblings had appeared in Broadway productions.

Mueller is Lutheran. She graduated from Evanston Township High School in 2001 and from Syracuse University in 2005.

Acting career

2005–2011: Chicago theatre 
After graduation, Mueller returned to Chicago and acted for the Chicago Shakespeare Theater, traveling in 2006 to England to perform at the Swan Theatre in Stratford-upon-Avon as Lady Mortimer in Henry IV. She followed this with various roles in the Chicago area including Lizzie Fields in Baby, the Lady-In-Waiting in Once Upon a Mattress, and Esther in Meet Me in St. Louis. At the Marriott Theatre in Lincolnshire, Illinois, she performed in Shout! The Mod Musical, Shenandoah, Guys and Dolls as Miss Adelaide, and Fiddler on the Roof as Tzeitel. In 2009 Mueller performed in two musicals at the Goodman Theatre, Animal Crackers as Grace/Mary and A Christmas Carol as Belle/Catherine.

In 2011, she was named Actor of the Year by the Chicago Tribune and also was nominated for two Joseph Jefferson Awards, winning Best Lead Actress in a Musical for her performance as Amalia Balash in She Loves Me.

2011–2016: Broadway debut and initial success 
Mueller made her Broadway debut in a revised revival of On a Clear Day You Can See Forever as Melinda Wells, a role originated by Barbara Harris. The production opened in December 2011. Mueller received critical praise for her performance, with one reviewer commenting, "Her voice contains notes of Garland, but she's no diva — this is a star of supreme self-possession". For this role, Mueller was nominated for the Drama Desk Award for Outstanding Featured Actress in a Musical and the Tony Award for Best Featured Actress in a Musical.

Mueller played Cinderella in The Public Theater's 2012 production of Stephen Sondheim's Into the Woods at the Delacorte Theater.

Mueller next was cast in the role of Helena Landless / Miss Janet Conover in Roundabout Theatre Company's 2012 revival of The Mystery of Edwin Drood, for which she was nominated for a Drama Desk Award. She then took over the role of Billie Bendix in Nice Work If You Can Get It, from March 29, 2013, until the show closed on June 15, 2013. Also in 2013, she once again took on the role of Carrie Pipperidge in Carousel at Lincoln Center in a staged concert production backed by the New York Philharmonic. The show was filmed and aired on PBS' Live from Lincoln Center.

Mueller starred in Beautiful: The Carole King Musical, which opened on Broadway on January 12, 2014. She originated the title role of Carole King. She had performed this role in the try-out in San Francisco in 2013. Her performance won her the Drama Desk Award and Tony Award for Best Lead Actress in a Musical. She left the Broadway production on March 6, 2015. On February 8, 2015, Mueller won the Grammy Award for Best Musical Theater Album (shared with Carole King (music and lyrics) and producers Jason Howland, Steve Sidwell, and Billy Jay Stein).

On April 27, 2015, Mueller was the recipient of the Sarah Siddons Society Award at the Marriott Theatre in Lincolnshire, Illinois.

Mueller reprised her role as Jenna in the musical adaptation of the film Waitress on Broadway, having previously played the role in a workshop of the musical in late 2014. With music and lyrics by Sara Bareilles and direction by Diane Paulus, the musical began its out-of-town tryout at the American Repertory Theater in August 2015. Waitress opened on Broadway at the Brooks Atkinson Theatre on April 24, 2016. Mueller was nominated for awards including a Tony Award and a Drama Desk Award for her performance. Mueller also received critical praise for her performance. Charles Isherwood for the New York Times noted, "But it is when Ms. Mueller tears into the musical's climactic number, 'She Used to Be Mine,' that her talents are most fully and movingly harnessed... Ms. Mueller's vibrant performance of this gentle but wrenching song, featuring a melody that soars and then recedes in waves, is the high point of the show — and for that matter a high point of the Broadway season." Mueller left the production on March 26, 2017. Mueller's performance also earned her a 2016 Lilly Award for its message of female empowerment and safety.

2017–2019: Film career, Carousel, and other projects 
In April 2017, shortly after Mueller's departure from Waitress, it was announced that she would play the lead role of Julie Jordan in a Broadway revival of Carousel. The production began previews on February 28, 2018, at the Imperial Theatre and opened on April 12. The production closed on September 16, 2018.

Before beginning Carousel rehearsals, Mueller made her feature-film debut in Steven Spielberg's historical drama The Post. Mueller portrayed real life advice columnist Judith Martin (a.k.a. Miss Manners) alongside a cast including Meryl Streep, Tom Hanks, Sarah Paulson, and Carrie Coon. The film was released in select theaters on December 22, 2017, before its general release on January 12, 2018.

Also in 2017, Mueller was nominated for a Chicago/Midwest Emmy Award for her performance in the Lyric Opera's Chicago Voices concert, which was filmed and aired on WTTW.

In 2018, Mueller received three major nominations for her role as Julie Jordan, including her fifth Drama Desk nomination (and second win) and her fourth Tony Award nomination. She is the first actress in any Broadway production of Carousel to receive such nominations for the role.

In early 2019, Mueller starred as Marian Paroo, opposite Norm Lewis, in the Kennedy Center's semi-staged concert production of The Music Man. The production ran from February 6 through February 11. Later that year, Mueller portrayed country music legend Loretta Lynn in the Lifetime original movie Patsy & Loretta, alongside Megan Hilty as Patsy Cline. The film began production on location in Nashville in March and premiered on October 19, 2019.
 For this role, Mueller was nominated for a Critics' Choice Award.

2020–present: Broadway return and career moving forward 
Mueller is starring alongside Tracy Letts in the play The Minutes on Broadway. Previews began on February 25, 2020, at the Cort Theatre with the show originally scheduled open on March 15. However, the production, following a public mandate that closed all Broadway theaters, was halted due to the COVID-19 crisis. The show resumed previews in April 2022 at Studio 54 and officially opened on April 17.

On July 15, 2021, she joined the cast of a new movie set to be released from Paramount Pictures next year titled Secret Headquarters. Mueller also voiced the character Rider in the Netflix children's animated series Centaurworld, which premiered July 30, 2021.

Personal life 
In 2009, Mueller met and began a relationship with Andy Truschinski, an actor, film producer, and playwright, while performing opposite him in a Goodman Theatre production of A Christmas Carol. The couple reside together in New York City.

Activism and philanthropy 
Mueller has worked frequently with the Broadway community to raise awareness and funds for various causes including LGBT+ rights, anti-gun violence, women's rights, and adoption. She supports Broadway Cares/Equity Fights AIDS and has appeared on multiple volumes of their annual Carols for a Cure albums. In 2016, she was among numerous performers who teamed with Broadway personality Seth Rudetsky to record a cover of "What The World Needs Now" to support the LGBT Community of Central Florida after the Pulse nightclub shooting in Orlando; the movement included a benefit concert in Orlando as well as an appearance on Maya & Marty. Later that year, Mueller would again work with Rudetsky and his husband, James Wesley, to formulate the idea for Concert for America, a series of concerts supporting various social justice organizations.

Mueller is also known for her work supporting the arts and arts education. In 2014, Mueller performed at the launch of the FWD Theatre Project, a grassroots effort to support the creation of new musicals in the Chicago theatre community. In 2015, she performed with fellow Beautiful alum Jarrod Spector in a series of concerts benefitting various arts organizations. In 2016, she and partner Andy Truschinski were honored by the Alliance of Resident Theatres/New York with the Abe L. Blinder Award for Public Service and Arts Education. Mueller also recorded a song for the Museum of Modern Art's Pop! Goes the Easel album, a collection of children's songs inspired by works featured in the museum. In 2017, Mueller served as a mentor for students in Rosie's Theatre Kids, an organization started by actress and public personality Rosie O'Donnell to train and support youth in the performing arts. Mueller continues to support her own alma maters, performing at a benefit showcase for Evanston Township High School's YAMO theatre program in 2017 and providing opportunities for meetings and talkbacks with Syracuse University drama students. In her spare time, Mueller teaches master classes to young aspiring performers.

Mueller is a strong and consistent advocate for The Actors Fund.

Acting credits

Theatre

Film

Television

Discography

Cast recordings and soundtracks
 The Mystery of Edwin Drood – The 2013 New Broadway Cast Recording (2013)
 Beautiful: The Carole King Musical – Original Broadway Cast Recording (2014) 
 Waitress – Original Broadway Cast Recording (2016) 
 Carousel – 2018 Broadway Cast Recording (2018)
Patsy & Loretta - Original Motion Picture Soundtrack (2019)

Collaborative projects
 Broadway's Carols for a Cure, Volume 16 (2014) 
 Pop! Goes the Easel for MoMA (2016)
 From Broadway With Love: A Benefit Concert for Orlando (2016) 
 Broadway's Carols for a Cure, Volume 18 (2016)

As featured artist
 Sing You to Sleep by Anika Larsen (2014)

Accolades

Special honors and awards 
 Chicago Tribune's Actor of the Year Award – 2011
Sarah Siddons Society Actress of the Year Award – April 27, 2015
A.R.T./New York: Abe L. Blinder Award for Public Service and Arts Education – April 11, 2016
Lilly Award for Acting – May 23, 2016

References

External links
 
 
 

American stage actresses
Living people
Evanston Township High School alumni
1983 births
Tony Award winners
Drama Desk Award winners
Actresses from Evanston, Illinois
American television actresses
21st-century American actresses
Musicians from Evanston, Illinois
American musical theatre actresses
Grammy Award winners
Theatre World Award winners
Syracuse University College of Visual and Performing Arts alumni